Morphett Vale is a southern suburb of Adelaide, South Australia in the City of Onkaparinga. It is the largest suburb in the state, with a population of more than 23,000 and an area of 12.76 km2, followed by Paralowie with nearly 10,000 fewer residents. There are approximately 1,000 businesses in Morphett Vale.
The suburb is bordered by (clockwise from north) Sheriffs/Pimpala Road, Panalatinga Road, Doctors/Beach Road, and the Southern Expressway.

History

Morphett Vale was the first major town south of Adelaide. In October 1840, a town called Dublin was subdivided leading to the development of Morphett Vale.  By 1866, the town was said to have 'a large number of neat residences, many of which have fine vineyards attached'.

Morphett Vale was named after John Morphett. The town quickly boasted churches and chapels, a brewery, wind flour mill, court house and police station. 

Agriculture consisted of cereal, mixed farms and vineyards. 1852 saw the formation of the Morphett Vale District council which merged with Noarlunga in 1932. During the second world war the district was a major producer of flax.

Extensive land subdivision occurred during the 1960s, transforming the area from a rural region to a metropolitan suburb.

Some notable buildings and businesses include: Doctors House on the corner of Beach and Main South Roads (In the suburb of Hackham, one of the boundary suburbs), The Emu winery which was later demolished to make way for Wirreanda High School and a housing sub-division. The Heritage listed Old Courthouse is visible alongside early churches in William Street.

The Willunga railway line ran through the town until 1969, but has since been replaced by a bicycle/pedestrian path. The old Station Master's Residence is now the Southern Districts Workingman's Club and has been substantially remodelled to its current form. The last tenants of this building (Dopheide) are still residents of the Local Onkaparinga Council area.

Country Fire Service
The Morphett Vale CFS station is located on the corner of Doctors Road and States Road at Hackham. It is an entirely volunteer based brigade which has an active fire-fighter membership of around 50 volunteers. They also have approximately 8 volunteers who assist with Operational Support duties and approximately 9 cadets.
The brigade is one of the busiest in the state, responding to between 300 and 400 emergencies each year on average. 
The suburbs primarily covered by the brigade are Morphett Vale, Hackham, Onkaparinga Hills, Reynella and Woodcroft. 
These suburbs include approximately 25,000 residents as well as industrial zones and large areas of rural land.

The Morphett Vale CFS brigade currently has three appliances. Morphett Vale Pumper and Morphett Vale 34 are supplied by the government, whilst Morphett Vale QRV is a brigade owned appliance and was designed and built by the brigade.

Morphett Vale Pumper – This is the station's primary urban response vehicle, it was delivered to the brigade in December 2011.
It is a two-wheel drive pumper built by Fraser Fire and Rescue in New Zealand, it is based on the New Zealand Fire Service Type 1 pumper design on an Iveco Eurocargo cab / chassis.
Some of the specifications include; 2000 litre water tank, 750GPM pump with separate high pressure stage, 62m high pressure, hose reel, Modular body design, 5.17m3 usable locker volume, 60 litre A class foam tank with onboard refill pump, Direct injection foam system.

Morphett Vale 34 – The appliance is built on a four-wheel drive Isuzu FTS800 crew-cab chassis and carries 3000 litres of water. The pump is a GAAM MK450 coupled which provides simultaneous high pressure and volume stage operation, it is coupled to a Hatz diesel engine.

Morphett Vale Quick Response Vehicle (QRV) – This appliance is their quick rural response vehicle. The appliance is built on a Holden Rodeo tray top utility to which we have fitted a 350-litre water tank and a Darley Snuffer Compressed Air Foam System (CAFS) pump. The CAFS pump is capable of producing a very high quality foam with only minimal use of foam concentrate and water. 
With the CAFS pump operating it is possible to produce high quality foam for longer than 10 minutes using just the 400 litres of water in the tank, normal pumps would use a lot more water than 400 litres to produce the same result.

Schools
Morphett Vale boasts a number of schools within its boundaries including:

Primary schools
 Antonio Catholic School
 Calvary Lutheran School
 Coorara Primary School
 Flaxmill Primary School
 Morphett Vale Primary School (former Morphett Vale High School)
 Morphett Vale East Primary School
 Morphett Vale West Primary School
 Pimpala Primary School
 Stanvac Primary School
 Sunrise Christian School 
 John Morphett Primary School

R-12 Schools
 Prescott College Southern
 Southern Vales Christian College
 Woodcroft College

Secondary schools
 Wirreanda High School
Former Schools in the area
In 2000, Morphett Vale South Primary School was closed.  The site, located on Elizabeth Road next to the Elizabeth Road local shops, has now been completely cleared and turned into a housing estate.
Morphett Vale High School closed at the end of 2008. Original government plans for the site were to demolish the entire school and redevelop it into a new housing development, but after much objection from the community, mainly due to the school's oval regularly being used for club sporting events predominately football, it is the home ground of the OSBLFC. The school has been renovated, and transformed into a primary school, which opened in 2012.

Sporting clubs and grounds

 Morphett Vale Memorial Bowls Club – Morphett Vale Memorial Oval, Wheatsheaf Road
 Morphett Vale Football Club – Morphett Vale Memorial Oval, Wheatsheaf Road
 Morphett Vale Tennis Club – Morphett Vale Memorial Oval, Wheatsheaf Road
 Morphett Vale Netball Club – Morphett Vale Memorial Oval, Wheatsheaf Road
 Noarlunga Tigers Basketball Club – Wilfred Taylor Reserve, States Road
 Noarlunga United Soccer Club – Wilfred Taylor Reserve, States Road
 O'Sullivan Beach-Lonsdale Football Club – Morphett Vale Primary School, Sheriffs Road
 Onkaparinga Rugby Club – Wilfred Taylor Reserve, States Road

References

  Morphett Vale – European History and Heritage 

Suburbs of Adelaide